Starokaragushevo (İśke Qarağoş) is a rural locality (a village) in Kashkalevsky Selsoviet, Burayevsky District, Bashkortostan, Russia. The population was 291 as of 2010. There are 8 streets.

Geography 
Starokaragushevo is located 34 km southeast of Burayevo (the district's administrative centre) by road. Kizganbashevo is the nearest rural locality.

References 

Rural localities in Burayevsky District